Volodymyr Dmytrovych Khandohiy is a Ukrainian diplomat and politician. Khandohiy was the acting Minister of Foreign Affairs of Ukraine for six months in 2009.

Biography
Volodymyr Khandohiy graduated from the National Taras Shevchenko University of Kyiv and started his diplomatic career in 1975. Khandohiy is a former Ambassador to Belgium and Luxembourg (2000-2005) and the Netherlands (2000-2002) and a former Head of the Mission of Ukraine to NATO (2000-2005). Between 1995 and 1998, and from 27 December 2005 till his appointment as acting Minister, he was a Deputy Foreign Minister.

Khandohiy was the acting Minister of Foreign Affairs of Ukraine, after (on 3 March 2009) his predecessor Volodymyr Ohryzko was dismissed by the Ukrainian Parliament. On 9 October 2009 this parliament appointed Petro Poroshenko as foreign minister.

In 2012 he said that Yevhen Khytrov was a victim of bad refereeing at the 2012 London Olympics.

Khandohiy is married, and has a son and daughter.

References

 	 

Living people
1953 births
Taras Shevchenko National University of Kyiv alumni
Foreign ministers of Ukraine
Permanent Representatives of Ukraine to the United Nations
Ambassadors of Ukraine to the United Kingdom
Ambassadors of Ukraine to Belgium
Ambassadors of Ukraine to the Netherlands
Ambassadors of Ukraine to Luxembourg
Ambassadors of Ukraine to Canada
Heads of mission of Ukraine to NATO
Recipients of the Order of Merit (Ukraine), 3rd class
Commanders of the Order of Merit of the Republic of Poland